Waltraut Repa-Peck (2 September 1940 – 14 November 1998) was an Austrian foil fencer and academic artist. She competed at the 1960 and 1972 Summer Olympics.

References

External links
 

1940 births
1998 deaths
Austrian female foil fencers
Olympic fencers of Austria
Fencers at the 1960 Summer Olympics
Fencers at the 1972 Summer Olympics
Fencers from Vienna